693 (six hundred [and] ninety-three) is the natural number following 692 and preceding 694.

In mathematics
693 has twelve divisors: 1, 3, 7, 9, 11, 21, 33, 63, 77, 99, 231, and 693. Thus, 693 is tied with 315 for the highest number of divisors for any odd natural number below 900. The smallest positive odd integer with more divisors is 945, which has 16 divisors. Consequently, 945 is also the smallest odd abundant number, having an abundancy index of 1920/945 ≈ 2.03175.

693 appears as the first three digits after the decimal point in the decimal form for the natural logarithm of 2. To 10 digits, this number is 0.6931471805. As a result, if an event has a constant probability of 0.1% of occurring, 693 is the smallest number of trials that must be performed for there to be at least a 50% chance that the event occurs at least once. More generally, for any probability p, the probability that the event occurs at least once in a sample of n items, assuming the items are independent, is given by the following formula:

1 − (1 − p)n

For p = 10−3 = 0.001, plugging in n = 692 gives, to four decimal places, 0.4996, while n = 693 yields 0.5001.

693 is the lowest common multiple of 7, 9, and 11. Multiplying 693 by 5 gives 3465, the smallest positive integer divisible by 3, 5, 7, 9, and 11.

693 is a palindrome in bases 32, 62, 76, 98, 230, and 692. It is also a palindrome in binary: 1010110101.

The reciprocal of 693 has a period of six:  = 0..

693 is a triangular matchstick number.

References

Integers